This is a list of films produced by 20th Century Studios beginning in 2020.

All films listed are theatrical releases unless specified.

 Films labelled with a * symbol are streaming releases by a third-party.

2020s

Upcoming films

Undated films

See also
In-depth lists by other types
 List of 20th Century Studios theatrical animated feature films
 
20th Century-branded labels
 
Operating:
 Searchlight Pictures (list)
 20th Century Animation
 20th Digital Studio
 20th Century Family
 Star Studios

Defunct or divested:
 Blue Sky Studios (list)
 Fox 2000 Pictures
 Fox Atomic
 Fox Faith

Notes

References

External links
 

2020
20th Century Fox
Lists of films released by Disney
Twentieth, 2020
20th, 2020